The Chalk Line (also known under the working title ) is a 2022 Spanish mystery psychological thriller film directed by Ignacio Tatay in his feature debut. It stars Elena Anaya.

Plot
The story is primarily set in a residential area with upper-class villas. One night, Paula and her husband discover a wandering girl who is obsessed with a monster that will allegedly haunt her once she crosses a chalk square drawn on the ground. After attempting to amend their conjugal relationship, the couple pledges to foster the girl on a temporary basis.

Cast and characters

Production
Isabel Peña collaborated in writing the story. The project, a Pokeepsie Films production, was halted due to the onset of the COVID-19 pandemic in Spain. Filming resumed in July 2020, with Oriol Barcelona on cinematography duties. The film was shot at a number of locations in the Madrid region, including Madrid, San Lorenzo de El Escorial, Boadilla del Monte, as well as a set in Villaviciosa de Odón.

Release
Distributed by Sony Pictures Entertainment Iberia, the film was theatrically released in Spain on 9 September 2022 and came out on Netflix on 24 October 2022.

Reception

Box office
The Chalk Line grossed $177,828 in Spain.

Critical response
The review aggregator website Rotten Tomatoes reported a 67% approval rating, with an average score of 6.4/10, based on 9 reviews.

Raquel Hernández Luján of HobbyConsolas gave the film 78 points ("good"), deeming it to be "candy for thriller lovers", with "good performances and production values", endorsing a "memorable debut". Miguel Ángel Romero of Cinemanía rated the film 3 out of 5 stars, writing that Tatay makes a masterful debut, "a horror-tinged thriller whose strength lies in the acting quality of its protagonists". Jordi Batlle Caminal of Fotogramas rated Jaula 3 out of 5 stars, deeming the debut feature to be a "model exercise in genre cinema, well-made and without authorial pretensions", featuring a "spectacular" plot twist at the height of the hour mark. Marshall Shaffer of Decider.com considered that despite being a "promising feature debut" for Tatay, the film "never quite coheres as it should", failing to "fulfill all its ambitions or breakthrough beyond its (admittedly impressively crafted) atmosphere".

See also
 List of Spanish films of 2022

References

External links
 Jaula at ICAA's Catálogo de Cinespañol
 

2020s Spanish films
2020s Spanish-language films
2022 directorial debut films
2022 horror thriller films
2022 psychological thriller films
Films shot in Madrid
Films shot in the Community of Madrid
Film productions suspended due to the COVID-19 pandemic
Mystery horror films
Pokeepsie Films films
Spanish horror thriller films
Spanish mystery thriller films
Spanish psychological thriller films